James Randall Bailey (born June 9, 1948) is a former defensive lineman who played nine seasons in the National Football League. As a member of the Baltimore Colts, Bailey and his team won Super Bowl V. After ending his American football career, Bailey worked in gas and real estate in their business departments.

References

1948 births
Living people
Players of American football from Kansas City, Missouri
American football defensive linemen
Kansas Jayhawks football players
Baltimore Colts players
New York Jets players
Atlanta Falcons players